Arrive All Over You is the debut album by American singer-songwriter Danielle Brisebois, released on May 10, 1994, by Epic Records. It includes the singles "What If God Fell from the Sky", "Gimme Little Sign" and "I Don't Wanna Talk About Love". It was co-written and produced by Gregg Alexander, who also sang co-lead on "Promise Tomorrow Tonight". Brisebois and Alexander would later become the nucleus of the short-lived rock group New Radicals, which formed three years after the release of the album.

"Just Missed the Train", which also appears on Brisebois' second album Portable Life (albeit in a different version), has been covered by several artists, including Ringo Sheena, Trine Rein, Maarja, Kelly Clarkson and Carly Hennessy.

Track listing

Credits
 Danielle Brisebois – vocals, piano, acoustic guitar,
 Gregg Alexander – background vocals, co-lead on "Promise Tomorrow Tonight", acoustic guitar, electric guitar, tambourine
 Matt Laug – drums, percussion
 Pat Mastelotto – percussion
 Rusty Anderson – acoustic guitar, electric guitar
 John Pierce – bass guitar
 Merv Depeyer – keyboard
 Scott Plunkett – keyboard
 Mitch Kaplan – keyboard
 Kim Bullard – keyboard
 Claude Gaudette – accompanied Danielle on "Just Missed the Train"
 Bruce Horowitz – clapping
 Jeff Q – clapping

References

External links
 Danielle Brisebois lyrics
 NewRadicals.Us. Unofficial forum covering New Radicals, Gregg Alexander and Danielle Brisebois.

1994 debut albums
Danielle Brisebois albums
Epic Records albums
Albums produced by Gregg Alexander